Mohammad Marouf Jamhour Mohammadi  (born July 2, 1993) is an Afghan footballer who currently plays for Toofaan Harirod F.C., and Afghanistan national football team. He wears number 17 and his position on field is left midfield.

International career
Mohammadi played his first match against Pakistan, where he scored the final goal in a 3–0 win. It was also the first time an international football match had been held in Afghanistan for more than 36 years.

In the 2013 SAFF Championship Mohammadi played 4 games as Afghanistan won its first ever title., playing in the final win against India.

International goals

Club career
Mohammadi is a member of Toofaan Harirod F.C. On 19 October 2012 Mohammadi scored the first goal, just minutes into the match in a 2–1 win over Simorgh Alborz F.C. for Toofan to win the 2012 Afghan Premier League. Mohammadi also won the title of being the best player of the match, and the prize of 50,000 Afs attached to it.

Honours

Afghanistan
SAFF Championship: 2013

References

1993 births
Living people
Footballers from Kabul
Afghan footballers
Afghanistan international footballers
Association football midfielders